In chess, connected pawns are two or more pawns of the same color on adjacent , as distinct from isolated pawns. When attacking these chains, the weak spot is the backmost pawn because it is not protected by any other pawn.

Discussion
Connected pawns that are both passed, i.e., without any enemy pawns in front of them on the same file or adjacent files, are referred to as connected passed pawns. Such pawns can be very strong in the endgame, especially if supported by other pieces. Often the opponent must sacrifice  to prevent one of the pawns from promoting.

Connected passed pawns are usually superior to other passed pawns.  An exception is in an opposite-colored bishops endgame with a bishop and two pawns versus a bishop on the opposite color.  If the pawns are connected and not beyond their fifth , the position is a  whereas widely separated pawns would win.

Two connected pawns on the same rank without any friendly pawns on adjacent files are called hanging pawns.

Connected passed pawns

There is a saying that two connected passed pawns on the sixth  are stronger than a rook.  This is true if the other side has nothing but a rook to defend against the pawns (and the defender cannot immediately capture one of the pawns).  In this diagram, White wins:

1. c6 Rd3 
Similar is 1...Rc3.

2. c7 
Also winning is 2.d7 followed by 3.c7.

2... Rc3 3. d7 
And one of the pawns will promote.

See also
 Backward pawn
 Doubled pawns
 Isolated pawn
 Pawn structure

References

Bibliography

 
 

Chess terminology
Chess strategy